The West–Eastern Divan Orchestra is an orchestra based in Seville, Spain, consisting of musicians from countries in the Middle East, of Egyptian, Iranian, Israeli, Jordanian, Lebanese, Palestinian, Syrian and Spanish background.

It was founded in 1999 by the conductor Daniel Barenboim and academic Edward Said, and named after an anthology of poems by Goethe.

Martha Argerich, pianist and longtime performing partner of Barenboim, was named an honorary member of the orchestra in 2015.

In 2016, the Barenboim-Said Akademie was established in Berlin, Germany, as a state-accredited music conservatory offering Bachelor of Music degrees and Artist Diplomas. The Akademie, whose president is Daniel Barenboim, is based on the founding aims of the West–Eastern Divan Orchestra.

History
The Argentine-Israeli conductor Daniel Barenboim and the late Palestinian-American academic Edward Said founded the orchestra in 1999, and named the ensemble after an anthology of poems by Johann Wolfgang von Goethe. The first orchestra workshop was in Weimar, Germany, in 1999, after the organisation had received over 200 applications from Arab music students. Barenboim has also expressed interest in musicians from Iran (a non-Arab country but in conflict with Israel) and allocating three chairs for Iranian musicians to play in the orchestra each year.

In 2016, United Nations Secretary-General Ban Ki-moon designated the orchestra as a United Nations Global Advocate for Cultural Understanding, praising the orchestra's push for peace and unity.

Performances
The orchestra under Barenboim, in the presence of Italian President and Mrs. Giorgio Napolitano, performed for Pope Benedict XVI at the courtyard of the Apostolic Palace of Castel Gandolfo 11 July 2012, the abbot Saint Benedict of Nursia's (the founder of the Benedictines) feast day, and thus the name day of the Pope.

The West–Eastern Divan participated in the 9th Gwangju Biennale in 2012.

The orchestra, conducted by Barenboim, performed the complete Beethoven symphonic cycle at The Proms in July 2012 – the first time all nine symphonies were performed under a single conductor in a single Prom season since Henry Wood did so in 1942.

Since 2011, the orchestra has annually given a concert at Berlin's Waldbühne.

Aims
The aim of the West–Eastern Divan Orchestra is to promote understanding between Israelis and Palestinians and pave the way for a peaceful and fair solution of the Arab–Israeli conflict. Barenboim himself has spoken of the ensemble as follows:

"The Divan is not a love story, and it is not a peace story. It has very flatteringly been described as a project for peace. It isn't. It's not going to bring peace, whether you play well or not so well. The Divan was conceived as a project against ignorance. A project against the fact that it is absolutely essential for people to get to know the other, to understand what the other thinks and feels, without necessarily agreeing with it. I'm not trying to convert the Arab members of the Divan to the Israeli point of view, and [I'm] not trying to convince the Israelis to the Arab point of view.

But I want to – and unfortunately I am alone in this now that Edward died a few years ago – ...create a platform where the two sides can disagree and not resort to knives."

One of the young israeli musicians of the orchestra reinforced this point:

"Barenboim is always saying his project is not political. But one of the really great things is that this is a political statement by both sides. It is more important not for people like myself, but for people to see that it is possible to sit down with Arab people and play. The orchestra is a human laboratory that can express to the whole world how to cope with the other."

Andalucía
The orchestra has performed around the world.  It has an annual summer school in Seville.  Since 2002, the Junta de Andalucía (Regional Government of Andalusia) and a private foundation have provided a base for the ensemble in Seville, Spain.  Young musicians from Spain now also take part in the orchestra.

The West–Eastern Divan Workshop takes place during several weeks each summer in Andalucía. Once the working period is over, the concert tour of the West–Eastern Divan Orchestra starts. The orchestra has been awarded several prizes since its creation, among them the Príncipe de Asturias concord award in 2002 for Said and Barenboim, and the Premium Imperiale awarded by the Japan Arts Association.

In 2004, the Barenboim–Said Foundation, based in Seville and financed by the Junta de Andalucía was established with the purpose of developing several education through music projects based on the principles of coexistence and dialogue promoted by Said and Barenboim.  In addition to managing the orchestra, the Barenboim–Said Foundation assists with other projects such as the Academy of Orchestral Studies, the Musical Education in Palestine project and the Early Childhood Musical Education Project in Seville.

Media
A film by Paul Smaczny about the orchestra, Knowledge is the Beginning, won the Emmy Award for best documentary related to arts of 2006. In 2007, the orchestra received the Praemium Imperiale Grant for Young Artists. It has recorded for the Teldec label.

See also 
 Barenboim–Said Akademie
 The Edward Said National Conservatory of Music
 Music of Palestine

References

External links

 
 Warner Classics page on the orchestra
 Brown University page about the orchestra
 The Ticket Documentary from the BBC World Service in which Daniel Barenboim talks about the importance of his West–Eastern Divan Orchestra.
 33rd Cleveland Film Festival page on Knowledge is the Beginning
 Barenboim interviewed by Al Jazeera about the orchestra on its 10th anniversary

European youth orchestras
1999 establishments in Spain
Musical groups established in 1999
Culture in Weimar
Edward Said